Springwater Trail High School is a public high school in Gresham, Oregon, United States.

Academics
In 2008, 57% of the school's seniors received their high school diploma. Of 35 students, 20 graduated, 10 dropped out, 3 received a modified diploma, and 2 are still in high school.

2007 shooting incident 
On April 11, 2007, a former student at the school, Chad Escobedo, fired two shots at the school. 10 people were injured by the gunfire and broken glass. Escobedo was sentenced to 6 years in prison for the shooting.

See also 
 Springwater Corridor

References

Education in Gresham, Oregon
High schools in Multnomah County, Oregon
Educational institutions established in 2002
Public high schools in Oregon
Buildings and structures in Gresham, Oregon
2002 establishments in Oregon